Márcio Borges dos Santos (born 10 May 1989), commonly known as Márcio Pit, is a Brazilian footballer who currently plays as a left-back for FK Kukësi in the Albanian Superliga.

References

1989 births
Living people
Brazilian footballers
Brazilian expatriate footballers
Brazilian expatriate sportspeople in Albania
Expatriate footballers in Albania
FK Kukësi players
Kategoria Superiore players
Association football defenders
Sportspeople from Piauí